The Economic Freedom Fighters of Swaziland (EFF SWA) is a political movement in Eswatini founded in 2020.  The EFF SWA took an active role in the 2021 protests in the country and was observed to have played a key role in connecting activisties.  During the protests the EFF SWA reported that their president had been kidnapped by police.

References

2020 establishments in Africa
Swaziland
Political parties established in 2020
Political parties in Eswatini
Socialism in Eswatini
Socialist parties in Africa